Keelan Doss (born March 21, 1996) is an American football wide receiver for the Los Angeles Chargers of the National Football League (NFL). He played college football at UC Davis. He set school records in touchdowns (29) and all-purpose yards (4,218). Initially projected to be taken between the third and fifth rounds, Doss went undrafted in the 2019 NFL Draft.

Professional career

Oakland Raiders
Doss signed with the Oakland Raiders on April 28, 2019, as an undrafted free agent. He was waived on August 31, 2019.

Jacksonville Jaguars
On September 1, 2019, Doss was signed to the Jacksonville Jaguars practice squad.

Oakland / Las Vegas Raiders (second stint)
On September 8, 2019, the Raiders re-signed Doss to their active roster for $495,000 in base salary and a $300,000 signing bonus following the release of Antonio Brown.

Doss re-signed with the Raiders on May 6, 2020. He was waived on September 5, 2020, and signed to the practice squad the next day. He was elevated to the active roster on October 3 for the team's week 4 game against the Buffalo Bills, and reverted to the practice squad after the game. On January 26, 2021, Doss signed a reserves/futures contract with the Raiders.

Doss was released by Raiders on August 31, 2021.

Atlanta Falcons
On September 3, 2021, Doss was signed to the Atlanta Falcons practice squad. On October 26, 2021, Doss was released by the Falcons.

New York Jets
On November 16, 2021, Doss was signed to the New York Jets practice squad. On December 7, 2021, Doss was released from the practice squad.

New York Giants
On June 10, 2022, Doss signed with the New York Giants. He was waived on August 29.

Los Angeles Chargers
On October 5, 2022, Doss was signed to the Los Angeles Chargers practice squad. He was promoted to the active roster a month later. He was waived on November 19 and re-signed to the practice squad. He signed a reserve/future contract on January 17, 2023.

References 

1996 births
Living people
People from Alameda, California
Players of American football from California
Sportspeople from Alameda County, California
American football wide receivers
UC Davis Aggies football players
Oakland Raiders players
Jacksonville Jaguars players
Las Vegas Raiders players
Atlanta Falcons players
New York Jets players
New York Giants players
Los Angeles Chargers players